In topology, the nerve complex of a set family is an abstract complex that records the pattern of intersections between the sets in the family. It was introduced by Pavel Alexandrov and now has many variants and generalisations, among them the Čech nerve of a cover, which in turn is generalised by hypercoverings. It captures many of the interesting topological properties in an algorithmic or combinatorial way.

Basic definition
Let  be a set of indices and  be a family of sets .

In Alexandrov's original definition, the sets  are open subsets of some topological space .

The set  may contain singletons (elements  such that  is non-empty), pairs (pairs of elements  such that ), triplets, and so on.

Examples
Then , which is an abstract 1-simplex.
Then . Note that {1,2,3} is not in  since the common intersection of all three sets is empty; so  is an unfilled triangle.

The Čech nerve
Given an open cover  of a topological space , or more generally a cover in a site, we can consider the pairwise fibre products , which in the case of a topological space are precisely the intersections .

This is the Čech nerve. 

By taking connected components we get a simplicial set, which we can realise topologically: .

Nerve theorems
The nerve complex  is a simple combinatorial object. Often, it is much simpler than the underlying topological space (the union of the sets in ).

In general, this need not be the case. For example, one can cover any n-sphere with two contractible sets  and  that have a non-empty intersection, as in example 1 above. In this case,  is an abstract 1-simplex, which is similar to a line but not to a sphere.

However, in some cases  does reflect the topology of X. For example, if a circle is covered by three open arcs, intersecting in pairs as in Example 2 above, then  is a 2-simplex (without its interior) and it is homotopy-equivalent to the original circle.

Leray's nerve theorem 

Borsuk's nerve theorem 
There is a discrete version, which is attributed to Borsuk. Let K1,...,Kn be abstract simplicial complexes, and denote their union by K. Let Ui = ||Ki|| = the geometric realization of Ki, and denote the nerve of {U1, ... , Un } by N.

If, for each nonempty , the intersection  is either empty or contractible, then N is homotopy-equivalent to K.

A stronger theorem was proved by Anders Bjorner. if, for each nonempty , the intersection   is either empty or (k-|J|+1)-connected, then for every j ≤ k, the j-th homotopy group of N is isomorphic to the j-th homotopy group of K. In particular, N is k-connected if-and-only-if K is k-connected.

Čech nerve theorem 
Another nerve theorem relates to the Čech nerve above: if  is compact and all intersections of sets in C are contractible or empty, then the space 

Homological nerve theorem 
The following nerve theorem uses the homology groups of intersections of sets in the cover.

If HJ,j is the trivial group for all J in the k-skeleton of N(C) and for all j in {0, ..., k-dim(J)},  then N(C) is "homology-equivalent" to X in the following sense:

  for all j in {0, ..., k};
 if   then  .

See also
 Hypercovering

References 

Topology
Simplicial sets
Families of sets